The Charoen Pokphand Group Company, Ltd. (CP) is a Thai conglomerate based in Bangkok. It is Thailand's largest private company and the largest privately held Royal Warrant holder of the Thai Royal Family. The company describes itself as having eight business lines covering 13 business groups. , the group has investments in 21 countries.

It owns controlling stakes in Charoen Pokphand Foods (CPF), the world's largest producer of feed, shrimp, and a global top three producer of poultry, pork, among other agricultural produces. It also operates Southeast Asia's largest retail business by revenue, with over 12,000 7-Eleven stores the second largest in the world after the 20,000 stores in Japan and a leading cash and carry business through CP Axtra, formerly known as Siam Makro. In the telecommunications sector, CP Group subsidiary, True Group, is one of the largest telecom firms in Southeast Asia with over 25 million mobile customers.

With some 200 business subsidiaries in mainland China, CP Group is known in China as "Zhèng Dà" (正大 - "positive" or "upright"). When China opened up its economy in 1978, the CP Group was the first foreign investor in the country and became the first foreign company registered in the special economic zone of Shenzhen, Guangdong. The company is the single largest investor in Mainland China today commanding over fifth of China's entire feed meal market. The corporate registration number was "0001." Through its extensive investments, CP Group has been credited with changing the country's dietary habits and leading China's green revolution.

History
Charoen Pokphand traces its beginnings back to 1921, when immigrant brothers Chia Ek Chor (谢易初) and Chia Jin Hyang (謝進賢), hailing from Shantou, China, started a seed store named Chia Tai Chung on Songsawat Road in Bangkok's Chinatown during the reign of King Rama VI. They imported seeds and vegetables from China and exported pigs and eggs to Hong Kong, Taipei, Kuala Lumpur, and Singapore. The two brothers, who were virtually penniless, managed to scrape together enough capital to start their tiny seed shop. For the first few years of the businesses existence, the two brothers experimented to find their own market niche. By the 1950s, the shop began to specialize in exporting animal feed, particularly for chickens but the business struggled until the 1970s when the Bangkok Bank asked it to assume control of a bankrupt chicken farm. The shop later specialized in purchasing grown chickens for distribution to grocers and restaurants with vertically integrated strategy of feed-milling operations with chicken breeding. In 1969, the company had an annual turnover of US$1–2 million.

When the Thai economy was liberalized in the 1970s, the CP Group entered various business negotiations with several major Thai banks, the Thai government, and foreign firms. The CP Group would supply Thai farmers with chicks and feed and teach breeders how to raise chickens while the farmers would sell the grown chickens back to the CP Group which processed the chickens and sold them to high volume grocery stores, restaurants, and fast food franchises across Thailand. The CP Group expanded internationally exporting their contract farming formula across Southeast Asia and around the world to Mexico, Taiwan, Portugal, Mainland China, Indonesia, Turkey, and the United States. By the 1980s, with Thailand becoming a full blown capitalist economy, the CP Group entered the aquaculture business, turning their formula to raising and marketing shrimp.

The company increased its scope from selling vegetable seeds under the trademark of "Rua Bin" ('Aeroplane') to production of animal feed under Ek Chor's two elder sons, Jaran Chiaravanont and Montri Jiaravanont. The company further integrated its  business to include livestock farming, marketing, and distribution, under Dhanin Chearavanont. By the 1970s, the company had a virtual monopoly on the supply of chicken and eggs in Thailand. The company was known for vertical integration, expanding into several business lines, adding breeding farms, slaughterhouses, processed foods production, and, later, its own chain of restaurants.  CP had also gone international, launching feed mill operations in Indonesia in 1972, exporting chickens to Japan in 1973, then moving into Singapore in 1976.

In the 1980s, as mainland China opened up to foreign direct investment, the firm became the preferred partner for international brands such as Honda, Walmart, and Tesco. CP's family ties with the mainland enabled it to become the first foreign company to establish itself in the newly created Shenzhen Special Economic Zone, where the company set up its Chia Tai Co. subsidiary. In 1987, the company acquired the rights to the 7-Eleven convenience store chain and the KFC fast food restaurant chain. The company would also expand into Shanghai by manufacturing motorcycles under license from Honda and brewing beer with a license from Heineken. In 1989, CP entered the petrochemical business with Solvay of Belgium to launch Vinythai Co., a manufacturer of polyvinylchloride. In 1990, the CP Group acquired a stake in TelecomAsia, a joint venture with US telecommunications firm NYNEX to build and operate two million telephone lines in Bangkok worth some US$3 billion.  The CP Group also acquired interests in satellite launch, cable television, and mobile telephone services.

By the early-1990s, CP presided over some 200 subsidiaries in China. CP's investment in poultry production on the mainland was credited with changing the country's dietary habits, as per capita consumption more than doubled by the end of the decade. Starting in 1993, many subsidiaries went public. TA, Charoen Pokphand Feedmill, Siam Makro, and Vinythai were listed publicly on the Stock Exchange of Thailand (SET); its Hong Kong subsidiary, CP Pokphand, on the Hong Kong Stock Exchange; a Shanghai-based animal feed and poultry group on the Shanghai exchange; a real estate development arm, Hong Kong Fortune, on the Hong Kong Exchange; and Ek Chor China Motorcycle on the New York Stock Exchange. Having been listed on the Hong Kong Stock Exchange since 1981, CP Lotus, a retail arm of CP Group in China, opened its first store in Shanghai in 1997.

After the Asian financial crisis in 1997, CP consolidated into three business lines under its main brands: foods (CP Foods), retail (7-Eleven), and telecommunications (True). By the early-2000s, the CP Group claimed US$9 billion in business assets. The company sold its stakes in the Tesco Lotus venture with Tesco in 2003 due to its crisis policy in order to focus on 7-Eleven, in which, unlike Tesco, CP owns a majority, as its flagship retail arm.

In 2013, Charoen Pokphand has got clearance to buy HSBC's stake of Chinese Ping An Insurance. On 10 May 2013, in spite of a lack of loan from the China Development Bank, HSBC said "it was selling the 15.6 percent stake at HK$59 a share" to Charoen Pokphand Group.

In 2014, CP announced a tie-up with the Japanese general trading company Itochu under which CP acquired 4.9 percent of Itochu's listed stock for about US$1 billion, and Itochu in turn acquired a 25 percent stake in a Hong Kong-listed CP group company, CP Pokphand Co., for about US$854 million. This transaction made CP the third-largest shareholder in Itochu, and was marketed as an alliance between the two conglomerates with a focus on developing international food trading opportunities. In 2015, CP and Itochu announced that they would jointly take a US$10.4 billion stake in China's CITIC Limited, forming a trilateral alliance with Itochu and CP each holding 10 percent of CITIC's stock, one of the largest foreign investments in a Chinese state-owned company.

On 9 March 2020, CP Group submitted the winning bid to purchase Thai retailer, Tesco Lotus, for about US$10.6 billion. The purchase needed the approval of the Office of Trade Competition Commission (OTCC) as it could constitute a monopoly, given that CP already owns 7-Eleven convenience stores and the Makro cash-and-carry business. The sale became approved in Malaysia in November 2020 and in Thailand in December 2020, with rebranding of the acquired stores beginning in February 2021, replacing the Tesco corporate branding with that of Lotus's. 

In February 2021, CP Group was recognized as one of the World's Most Ethical Companies 2021" award from Ethisphere Institute, a global institution for evaluating ethical business standards.

In September 2021, CP Group raised $150 million from existing investors, raising the valuation of its Ascend Money subsidiary to $1.5 billion.

Subsidiaries

Charoen Pokphand Foods

Known as Charoen Pokphand Foods Plc., (CPF). It was established in 1978 with operations in animal feed production, livestock breeding, further processing and trade. Currently, CPF invests overseas in nine countries, has subsidiaries in 17 countries  and exports to over 40 countries. Furthermore, CPF is today the leading producer of feed and one of the largest producers of poultry in the world. Charoen Pokphand Foods is listed in the Stock Exchange of Thailand under the code: CPF.

CP Foods has a revenue of approximately US$14 billion (2012), with a market capitalization of over US$8 billion (2012)

CP ALL

CP ALL Public Company Limited is the flagship company of the Charoen Pokphand Group's marketing and distribution business. It is the Thai licensee of 7-Eleven since 1989 and operates  12,000 convenience stores under that trademark in Thailand. This is the third largest number of stores after the United States and Japan.

7-Eleven
CP All Plc. is the sole operator of 7-Eleven convenience stores in Thailand. The CP Group acquired the rights to distribute the convenience store in 1987. The first 7-Eleven outlet was opened in 1989 on Patpong Road in Bangkok. , the company had a total of 11,700 stores nationwide employing 170,000 workers. Of the total, 4,245 stores are in Bangkok and vicinity (44 percent) and 5,297 stores are in provincial areas (56 percent). There are 4,205 corporate-owned stores (44 percent), 4,645 franchise stores (49 percent), and 692 sub-area license stores (seven percent). An average of 11.7 million customers visit 7-Eleven stores each day. In 2016, the company expanded another 710 new stores both as stand-alone stores and stores at PTT gas stations. At the end of 2014, the company had 8,210 stand-alone stores (86 percent) and 1,332 stores in PTT gas stations (14 percent). The company has plans to open approximately 700 new stores annually, with the goal of 10,000 stores in 2017.

True Corporation

The Telecommunications Business Group was established during the late 1980s. Known as True Corporation Plc, True offers a ‘convergence’ of voice, video and data services across its integrated communications platform. Based in Bangkok, True currently services more than 23 million subscribers to its various services, which includes Thailand's third-largest mobile operator (TrueMove), the country's largest broadband and dial-up internet provider, largest fixed-line phone operator in Bangkok Metropolitan Area, electronic cash and payment services, personal communication telephone, data services, VoIP services, online portals, online games and is the only nationwide cable-TV provider (TrueVisions). True Corporation is listed on the Stock Exchange of Thailand under the code: TRUE

True Corporation generated approximately US$3.1 billion in revenue in 2012, it has a market capitalization of about US$4.3 billion (2013). It is spinning off its infrastructure operations into a new telecommunications fund set to IPO at about US$1.8 billion, putting the group's total value at about US$5 billion.

On November 22, 2021, Telenor and Charoen Pokphand Group, officially announced they have agreed to explore a USD 8.6 billion merger plan between Thailand’s second and third largest telecom operators (by subscribers), True Corporation (TRUE) and Total Access Communication (DTAC) – The proposed merger is subject to regulatory approvals. The merger was "acknowledged" by the regulator NBTC at a meeting on October 20, 2022. The newly merged company still retain the True Corporation name, which was founded on March 1, 2023 and it was listed on the Stock Exchange of Thailand under the stock ticker symbol TRUE on March 3, 2023.

Ascend Group

Founded in 2014 as a spin-off of True Corporation, Ascend Group handles the e-commerce, online retail, logistics and fulfillment component of CP Group. It marked its $150-million expansion by launching their affiliates in the Philippines and Indonesia, Vietnam, and also hard to reach economies like Myanmar and Cambodia. Ventures are classified under major subsidiaries: Ascend Commerce, Ascend Money and Ascend Capital, along with smaller independent ventures like TrueIDC and Egg Digital.

Lotus Supercenter
CP Lotus Corporation is a retail operation in China.

C.P. Pokphand Co., Ltd.
Listed in Hong Kong, CPP is one of the world's largest producers of feed and one of China's leading agricultural companies with factories nationwide.

CP Fresh Mart
A Thai-based chain selling frozen foods and finished products, now with over 700 branches.

Dayang Motors
One of China's leading motorcycle producers Dayang Motors, recently signed a joint venture to begin production of cars in Thailand. Its motorcycles are exported to Southeast Asia, Europe, and Africa.

Solvay
In 1989, CP entered the petrochemical business through a joint venture with Solvay, one of Belgium's largest chemical firms. But later sold its stakes.

Wal-Mart
In 1994, CP signed a joint venture agreement with American retail giant, Wal-Mart to establish super-retail stores throughout Asia and later dissolved it.

CP Beverages & Food
CP B&F is the Beverages arm of CP and was established in 2016 in Bangkok, Thailand. It operates Cafes, QSR, Logistics Brands namely Arabitia Cafe, Jungle Cafe, Farmee, Daily Runner and also is into Export - Import Business. The company now operates in 5 countries - China, Thailand, India, Cambodia, Laos and Myanmar and has 5 subsidiaries - CP B&F India Pvt Ltd, CP B&F (Thailand) Co. Ltd, CP B&F (Cambodia) Co., Ltd. In September 2020, CP B&F (Vietnam) Private Company Limited has been established in Vietnam.

SAIC Motor-CP 
SAIC Motor-CP Co., Ltd. is a 50-50 joint venture between CP and Chinese automotive manufacturer SAIC Motor. It produces MG vehicles in a manufacturing plant in Chonburi. MG vehicles are distributed in Thailand by MG Sales (Thailand) Co., Ltd.

Slavery revelations
After a several-month-long investigation, in 2014 the British newspaper The Guardian reported that Charoen Pokphand (CP) Foods purchases fishmeal, which it then feeds to its farmed prawns, from suppliers that own, operate or buy from fishing boats manned with slaves. The Guardian reported that after the slaves are bought for roughly US$250, the working conditions on those boats include forced labour with 20-hour work days, forced drug use, starvation and executions. CP Foods readily admitted to the use of slave labour in its supply chain.

Shrimp feed supply chain traceability and audit
CP Foods produces and sells farmed shrimp. It does not own or operate any fishing vessels. The company has worked to improve the traceability of the fishmeal element of its supply chain since 2012, and broadened this effort to encompass a full traceability system for its farmed shrimp supply chain in 2014. As part of that process, CP Foods has reduced the number of suppliers who provide fishmeal for the production of shrimp feed.

CP Foods has undertaken a full independent, third-party audit of its shrimp feed supply chain (all the way back to the individual fishing boats catching fish for fishmeal production), conducted by a leading international supply chain audit company. Approved by-product fishmeal in shrimp feed is certified "IFFO RS CoC", the highest international benchmark for sustainable fishmeal.

Shrimp Sustainable Supply Chain Task Force
CP Foods is a founding member of the Shrimp Sustainable Supply Chain Task Force (SSSC), established in July 2014, which has convened food producers, international retailers, and NGOs to map out a holistic improvement and audit plan for the Thai shrimp industry, and to identify and agree the steps and timetable to increase the sustainability and transparency of the supply chain. The key aim of CP Foods and the SSSC is to ensure that abuse of workers and damage to the maritime ecosystem in the Gulf of Thailand and Andaman Sea is a thing of the past, and to restore trust in the industry.

References

External links
 Corporate website
 International Directory of Company Histories, Vol.62: Charoen Pokphand Group, St. James Press, 2004

 
Agriculture companies of Thailand
Conglomerate companies of Thailand
Real estate companies of Thailand
Retail companies of Thailand
Shipping companies of Thailand
Manufacturing companies based in Bangkok
1921 establishments in Siam
Conglomerate companies established in 1921
Food and drink companies established in 1921
Retail companies established in 1921
Telecommunications companies established in 1921
Thai Royal Warrant holders
Meat packers